Tolkien: A Look Behind "The Lord of the Rings" is a study of the works of J. R. R. Tolkien written by Lin Carter. It was first published in paperback by Ballantine Books in March 1969 and reprinted in April 1969, April 1970, July 1971, July 1972, February 1973, July 1973, June 1975 and November 1977, after which it went out of print for over twenty-five years. The book has been translated into French, Japanese and Polish. A new edition updated by Adam Roberts was published by Gollancz in August 2003; it constituted both the first British edition and first hardcover edition. The first American hardcover edition was published by Tor Books in 2004.

The original version of the book was among the earliest full-length critical works devoted to Tolkien's fantasies, and the first to set his writings in their proper context in the history of fantasy. It was the earliest of three important studies by Carter devoted to fantasy/horror writers and the history of fantasy, being followed by Lovecraft: A Look Behind the "Cthulhu Mythos" (1972) and Imaginary Worlds: the Art of Fantasy (1973), and helped establish him as an authority on the genre, indirectly leading to his editorial guidance of the groundbreaking Ballantine Adult Fantasy series.

Outline
Carter's study was intended to serve as an introduction to Tolkien for those unfamiliar with his work. His introduction briefly reviews the publishing phenomenon of The Lord of the Rings and its burgeoning popularity in the wake of the first paperback editions in the 1960s, after which he devotes three chapters to a short biography of the author through the late 1960s, including an account of how The Lord of the Rings was written.

Four chapters follow explaining Tolkien's invented Middle-earth and summarizing the stories of The Hobbit and the three volumes of The Lord of the Rings, for the benefit of readers who may not have yet actually read the works.

Carter next turns to the question of what the works are, a point of some confusion at the time. The then-current vogue for realistic fiction provided critics with few tools for evaluating an out-and-out fantasy on its own terms, and attempts were rife to deconstruct it as a satire or allegory. Carter gently but firmly debunks these efforts, supporting his argument by drawing on Tolkien's own published ruminations on the functions and purposes of fantasy.

He then contextualizes Tolkien's works by broadly sketching the history of written fantasy from its earliest appearance in the epic poetry of the ancient world through the heroic poetry of the Dark Ages and the prose romances of the medieval era, down to the fairy tales, ghost stories and gothic novels of the early modern era and the rediscovery of the genre by writers of the 19th and 20th centuries, prior to and contemporary with Tolkien. The origins of the modern genre are discovered in the writings of William Morris, Lord Dunsany and E. R. Eddison and followed through the works of authors they influenced, including H. P. Lovecraft, Fletcher Pratt and L. Sprague de Camp, and Mervyn Peake.

Carter next highlights some of Tolkien's particular debts to his predecessors, early and modern, tracing the motifs and names he utilizes back to their beginnings in Norse mythology and highlighting other echoes in his work deriving from legend and history.

A "Postscript" features Tolkien's influence on contemporary fantasy, which was evident in the 1960s, primarily in the juvenile fantasies of Carol Kendall, Alan Garner, and Lloyd Alexander.

The 2003 updated edition of 2003 contains includes material on the 2001–2003 film adaptation of The Lord of the Rings in the introduction, covers the story of The Silmarillion in the chapter "Tolkien Today", and expands the postscript "After Tolkien" on recent fantasy writers.

Contents

Author's Note
An Introduction
The Lives and Times of Professor Tolkien
How The Lord of the Rings Came to be Written
Tolkien Today
Of Middle-Earth and the Story of The Hobbit
The Story of The Fellowship of the Ring
The Story of The Two Towers
The Story of The Return of the King
The Trilogy—Satire or Allegory?
Tolkien's Theory of the Fairy Story
Fantasy in the Classical Epic
Fantasy in the Chanson de Geste
Fantasy in the Medieval Romance
The Men Who Invented Fantasy
Tolkien's Basic Sources
On the Naming of Names
Some People, Places, and Things
Postscript: After Tolkien
Appendix A: A Checklist of Critical Literature on The Lord of the Rings
Appendix B: A Selected Bibliography

Reception

Richard C. West, writing in the J.R.R. Tolkien Encyclopedia, assesses the book in these words: "The honor of the first worthwhile book on Tolkien must go to Carter, who was widely read in literature from ancient times to the twentieth century, and his 1969 book surveys a long list of works behind The Lord of the Rings from all periods. Unfortunately, he did not have the scholarly training to do this with sufficient rigor and the book has many factual errors throughout, but his enthusiasm is infectious."

J. C. Lobdell in National Review calls the study a "pleasant but not very rewarding book," though "not the worst book to be written on the subject." He feels "what [Carter] has to say is to the point" when "discussing Tolkien himself, [or] recounting his own discovery of the names of the dwarves, in The Elder Edda, [but] when he discusses the history of fantasy, he seems to be walking on unfamiliar ground—not to mention ground rather far distant from Middle-Earth—and the value of what he has to say is questionable." Still, Lobdell notes, "it is probably a good thing to be reminded that others besides the master have tried their hand at heroic fantasy." He finds Carter's philology "clearly inexpert" where not "demonstrably inaccurate," and suspected that the book was "rushed into print to take advantage of the current Tolkien mania."

Notes

External links 
 Tolkien: A Look Behind The Lord of the Rings by Lin Carter – review of the 2003 updated edition by Nicholas Whyte (negative)
 [ Updated edition, 2003] – British Library catalogue record (does not name Roberts)
 Updated edition, 2003 - one WorldCat library record (does not name Roberts)

1969 non-fiction books
Fantasy books
Books of literary criticism
Books about Middle-earth
Books by Lin Carter
Ballantine Books books
Works by Adam Roberts (British writer)